The Old Naval Hospital is a historic building located at 921 Pennsylvania Avenue, Southeast Washington, D.C., in the Capitol Hill neighborhood.

History

In March 1864, president Abraham Lincoln asked Congress to construct the hospital. It was constructed in July 1866, for $115,000. Designed to accommodate 50 patients, the new hospital had good ventilation, running water, and gas lighting.

In 1906, the hospital moved to its new facility at Observatory Hill, 23rd Street, and E Streets, N.W.

In 1922, the building became the Temporary Home for Veterans of All Wars. The property is still owned by the federal government but its jurisdiction was transferred to the District of Columbia in 1962. The building was vacant for many years.

The Friends of the Old Naval Hospital has raised money to restore the building, at an estimated cost of $12 million. The plan is for the Hill Center to be a facility for education and community life on Capitol Hill. Restoration started in June 2010.

References

External links

 Hill Center (Old Naval Hospital) website

Medical installations of the United States Navy
Military installations closed in the 1920s
Defunct hospitals in Washington, D.C.
Hospital buildings on the National Register of Historic Places in Washington, D.C.
Hospitals established in 1866
Italianate architecture in Washington, D.C.
Military hospitals in the United States
United States Marine Corps installations
1866 establishments in Washington, D.C.